Izak Davel (born 1 July 1983 in South Africa) is a South African actor, singer, dancer and male model. He matriculated at the Lady Grey Arts Academy in 2001 after which he proceeded to study dance at the Tshwane University of Technology and finished his studies in 2004.

He has participated in many works in theatre and played Scab on the soap opera Egoli from 2006 until its finale in 2010. He appeared on the third season of Survivor South Africa in 2010 where he became well known for wearing only a red speedo and currently plays Bradley Haines on the SABC 3 soap opera Isidingo

Davel was approached by the music promoter Stephen Stewart, who is known for his marketing and publicity of Rina Hugo, Sonja Herold, Manuel Escorcio, Juanita du Plessis and Lieflinge and contributed to sales of over 500 000 albums sold. Davel launched his singing career with the release of his debut album, Ken Jy My? in 2008.

Theatre appearances 
The Tshwane Dance Season
The Sleeping Beauty
The Rite of Spring
Pippin
The Queen Show
Best of the Boys
Joseph
Life at Centre
Jesus Christ Superstar

Filmography

Television
Egoli (2006–2010)
Survivor South Africa: Santa Carolina (2008)
Isidingo (2013–)

Film

Getroud Met Rugby: Die Onvertelde Storie (2011)
Platteland (2011)
Hoofmeisie (2011)

Discography

Ken Jy My? (2008)
Produced by Stephen Stewart and Werner Beukes 

Ken jy my
Stuur my 'n email
Jy's my DJ
Petrol vir my vuur
My verstaan
Limmm Boe
Is jy in of uit?
Sal jy bly?
Vir altyd
Langpad
Skerwe van glas
1000 Uur
Terug na my
Laat my lewe (saam met Jo-mari)

References 

1984 births
21st-century South African male singers
Afrikaans-language singers
Living people
South African male stage actors
South African male television actors
South African male models
Tshwane University of Technology alumni